Stiretrus decemguttatus is a South American species of true bug found on Ipomoea asarifolia, where it preys upon late instar Botanochara sedecimpustulata and Zatrephina lineata larvae.

References

Asopinae
Hemiptera of South America
Insects described in 1828